Wiens  is a surname. Notable people with the surname include: 

Berny Wiens (born 1945), Canadian politician
Dallas Wiens (born 1985), American recipient of a full face transplant
David Wiens, American cross-country mountain bike racer
Douglas Wiens, Canadian mathematician
Douglas A. Wiens, American geophysicist
Edith Wiens (born 1950), Canadian opera, recital and concert singer 
John Wiens, American ornithologist
Mark Wiens, American travel and food blogger and television host
Nathan Wiens, Canadian naturalistic designer and woodworker
Paul Wiens (1922–1982), German poet, translator and author
Robert Wiens (born 1953), Canadian visual artist
Rudolph H. Wiens, an aurora scientist
Wiens Peak, a peak in Antarctica named after Rudolph H. Wiens
Rylan Wiens (born 2002), Canadian sports diver

See also
Wien (Vienna)
Wein

Russian Mennonite surnames